Ken Ard may refer to:

 Ken Ard (dancer) (born 1960), American dancer, actor and singer
 Ken Ard (politician) (born 1963), 88th Lieutenant Governor of South Carolina